The 80th season of the Campeonato Gaúcho kicked off on January 23, 2000 and ended on June 18, 2000. Seventeen teams participated. Caxias beat Grêmio in the finals and won their 1st title. Avenida and Internacional de Santa Maria were relegated.

Participating teams

System 
The championship would have three stages:

 First phase: The thirteen teams that didn't participate in the Copa Sul-Minas were joined by Rio Grande, which had been invited in celebration of its 100th anniversary, and were divided in two groups of seven teams. the teams in each group played against each other in a double round-robin system. After 14 rounds, the two best teams in each group qualified, along with the best non-qualified team, while the team with the fewest points in each group was relegated, to dispute the Second level in the same year. Rio Grande, as a guest, would be relegated after that year regardless of placing.
 Second phase: The five remaining teams joined the teams that participated in the Copa Sul-Minas (Internacional, Grêmio and Juventude), and played against each other twice, with the winners of each half qualifying to the Finals. The three best teams qualified to the next year's Copa Sul-Minas.
 Finals: The Second phase round winners played in two matches to define the Champions.

Championship

First phase

Group 1

Group 2

First round

Second round

Final standings

Finals

References 

Campeonato Gaúcho seasons
Gaúcho